Curie is the codename for a GPU microarchitecture developed by Nvidia, and released in 2004, as the successor to Rankine microarchitecture. It was named with reference to the Polish physicist Marie Salomea Skłodowska–Curie and used with the GeForce 6 and 7 series. Curie was followed by Tesla.

Graphics features 

 DirectX 9.0c (9_3)
 OpenGL 2.1
 Shader Model 3.0
 Nvidia PureVideo (first generation)
 Reintroduced support for Z compression
 Hardware support for MSAA anti-aliasing algorithm (up to 4x)

The lack of unified shaders makes DirectX 9.0c the last supported version of DirectX for GPUs based on this microarchitecture.

GPU list

GeForce 6 (6xxx) series

Features

GeForce 7 (7xxx) series

Features

See also 
 List of eponyms of Nvidia GPU microarchitectures
 List of Nvidia graphics processing units
 Nvidia PureVideo
 Scalable Link Interface (SLI)
 Qualcomm Adreno

References 

GPGPU
Nvidia Curie
Nvidia microarchitectures
Parallel computing
Graphics cards